The 6th Texas Legislature met from November 5, 1855 to September 1, 1856 in its regular session and one adjourned session. All 80 members of the Texas House of Representatives and about half of the members of the Texas Senate were elected in 1855.

Sessions
 6th Regular session: November 5, 1855 – February 4, 1856
 6th Adjourned session: July 7–September 1, 1856

Party summary

Officers

Senate
 Lieutenant Governor Hardin Richard Runnels, Democrat
 President pro tempore Jesse Grimes, Regular session, Adjourned session

House of Representatives
 Speaker of the House  Hamilton P. Bee

Members

Senate
Members of the Texas Senate for the Sixth Texas Legislature:

House of Representatives
Members of the House of Representatives for the Sixth Texas Legislature:

 John David German Adrian
 Hamilton P. Bee
 N. B. Charlton
 John Winfield Scott Dancy
 Isaac N. Dennis
 Julien Sidney Devereux
 David Catchings Dickson
 Mathew Duncan Ector
 James Carlton Francis
 James Alfred Head
 John Rhodes King
 Pleasant Williams Kittrell
 Matthew Fielding Locke
 Jefferson Carruthers McAlpine
 John Hazelrigg McClanahan
 Robert Caldwell Neblett
 William Beck Ochiltree
 Dr. Lewis S. Owings
 Benjamin F. Parker
 John Sayles
 Ashbel Smith
 William Stedman
 Benjamin E. Tarver
 William S. Taylor
 William M. "Buckskin" Williams
 Israel Worsham

Membership Changes

External links

06 Texas Legislature
1855 in Texas
1856 in Texas
1855 U.S. legislative sessions
1856 U.S. legislative sessions